João Carlos Pinto Chaves (born 1 January 1982), known as just João Carlos, is a Brazilian former professional footballer who played as a central defender.

Career
Born in Rio de Janeiro, João Carlos has played professionally in Brazil, Bulgaria, Belgium and Russia for Vasco da Gama, CSKA Sofia, Lokeren, Genk and Anzhi Makhachkala.

Honours
Genk
Belgian Cup: 2008–09

References

External links
João Carlos at ZeroZero

1982 births
Living people
Footballers from Rio de Janeiro (city)
Brazilian footballers
Brazilian expatriate footballers
CR Vasco da Gama players
PFC CSKA Sofia players
K.S.C. Lokeren Oost-Vlaanderen players
K.R.C. Genk players
FC Anzhi Makhachkala players
FC Spartak Moscow players
First Professional Football League (Bulgaria) players
Belgian Pro League players
Russian Premier League players
Expatriate footballers in Bulgaria
Brazilian expatriate sportspeople in Bulgaria
Expatriate footballers in Belgium
Brazilian expatriate sportspeople in Belgium
Expatriate footballers in Russia
Brazilian expatriate sportspeople in Russia
Expatriate footballers in the United Arab Emirates
Al Jazira Club players
Association football defenders
UAE Pro League players